The Prior of Strath Fillan was the head of the Augustinian monastic community of Strathfillan Priory, Strath Fillan in Argyll (now in the Stirling council area). The priors are badly documented and few are known.

List of office holders

List of known priors
 John de Mortimer, x 1414
 Celestine (Cellach) "MacLaureus", 1414–1428
 Robert Beaton, 1428–1430
 John Murray, fl. 1498
 John Gray, fl. 1543
 Hugh Curry, 1547–1551
 John Paterson, 1551

List of known commendators
 Thomas Malvil, 1556
 Patrick Murray, 1556
 John MacCorcadill, 1569–1583 x 1584
 Donald McVicar/MacPherson, 1583–1585 x 1607

See also
 Strath Fillan Priory

References
 Watt, D.E.R. & Shead, N.F. (eds.), The Heads of Religious Houses in Scotland from the 12th to the 16th Centuries, The Scottish Records Society, New Series, Volume 24, (Edinburgh, 2001), pp. 207–8

Strath Fillan
Strath Fillan
Strath Fillan
Strath Fillan